Nádson Alves Viana, known as Nádson (born 21 February 1992) is a Brazilian football player who plays for Gafanha.

Club career
He made his professional debut in the Segunda Liga for Beira-Mar on 12 August 2014 in a game against União da Madeira.

References

1992 births
Sportspeople from Salvador, Bahia
Living people
Brazilian footballers
Esporte Clube Bahia players
S.C. Beira-Mar players
Brazilian expatriate footballers
Expatriate footballers in Portugal
Liga Portugal 2 players
Atlético Clube de Portugal players
Association football forwards